is a 1967 Japanese comedy film by film director Yoji Yamada.

Plot summary
The movie begins in an old castle in Europe with a very old woman lying in a bed, most likely dying. A priest, a nun and a man are praying in front of her bed. As they are praying, another man enters. He is a Japanese actor who, in broken German, says that he must talk to the old woman. The priest tries to hush him, but the old woman tells him to come in.

Cast
 Chieko Baisho
 Muga Takewaki
 Hiroshi Inuzuka
 Yumiko Kokonoe

References

1967 films
1967 comedy films
Films directed by Yoji Yamada
Japanese comedy films
1960s Japanese-language films
1960s Japanese films